The  is a railway line in Japan linking Higashi-Noshiro Station in Akita Prefecture with Kawabe Station in Aomori Prefecture, in the northern Tōhoku region of Honshu. The line stretches 147.2 km (91.5 mi) along the Sea of Japan coast with a total of 43 stations. The Gonō Line is operated by East Japan Railway Company (JR East).

Station list
 For the Resort Shirakami rapid service, please see its article.
 Trains may pass at stations marked "◇", "v", or "^".

Rolling stock

 KiHa 40 series DMU
 HB-E300 series DMU
 GV-E400 series DMU

History
The first section of the Gonō Line was opened by the Japanese Government Railways (JGR) from Higashi-Noshiro to Noshiro in 1908.

The company was nationalized in 1927, with the Goshogawara Line being absorbed into the Mutsu Railway.

A CTC system was installed  in 1986. With the privatization of the Japanese National Railways (successor of JGR) on April 1, 1987, the Gonō Line came under the control of the East Japan Railway Company (JR East).

See also
List of railway lines in Japan

References

Further reading

External links

 JR East website 

 
Rail transport in Aomori Prefecture
Rail transport in Akita Prefecture
Lines of East Japan Railway Company
1067 mm gauge railways in Japan
Railway lines opened in 1908
1908 establishments in Japan